Which Witch is a 1987 musical written by Benedicte Adrian and Ingrid Bjørnov.

Which Witch may also refer to:

 Which Witch? (board game), a children's game
 Which Witch? (novel), a 1979 children's novel by Eva Ibbotson
 "Which Witch!", a sub-episode of Tom and Jerry Tales
 "Which Witch", a 2015 song by Florence and the Machine from the deluxe edition of their third album How Big, How Blue, How Beautiful

See also 
 "Which Witch Is Which?", an episode of The Worst Witch
 Which Wich?, an American sandwich restaurant chain